Kriengsak Chareonwongsak  is a Thai scholar and politician. He established the first future studies research institute in Southeast Asia, and was a Member of Thailand's House of Representatives, was on the executive Board for the Democrat Party, and has published on both scholarly and popular topics.

Early life and education
Kriengsak Chareonwongsak was born Bangkok. After finishing high school at the New Berlin High School in Wisconsin on a one-year American Field Service (AFS) scholarship, he completed a Bachelor of Economics and PhD in Economics, both on scholarship at Monash University, Melbourne, Australia.

He completed a Master of Public Administration degree at the Kennedy School of Government, Harvard University; and holds a master's degree, from Cambridge Judge Business School at the University of Cambridge, UK and postdoctoral studies at University of Oxford.

Institute of Future Studies for Development
The theses of most of Chareonwongsak's writings centre on promoting national development. To this end, he established Thailand's first institution for futures studies in 1994. Institute of Future Studies for Development (IFD), a non-profit academic research organization, conducts futures studies especially in the fields of economic and human resource development which focuses on interdisciplinary future studies contributing to economic, human resource, and national development. IFD takes a multi-disciplinary approach to its research across a broad spectrum of academic fields and emphasizes sustainable solutions to offset future problems in Thai society. IFD, under Chareonwongsak's leadership, has worked for change in Thailand's banking, finance, governance, and education infrastructures. The IFD focuses on research activities, and also organizes and hosts seminars, talk-shows, academic conferences, and forums among Thai intellectuals and policy-makers, publishing findings in newspapers, magazines, and academic journals.

Business career

As a businessman, he is Chairman of the Success Group of companies, a conglomerate of media businesses including, broadcasting, publishing, educational multimedia production and distribution, internet web site and domain development, web hosting, web-based applications, systems integration and retail outlets, internet service provision (ISP), hotel booking online, e-commerce, and web portals. Other areas under the Success umbrella include biotechnology, finance and securities, investment, trading, animal health products, hotel, travel industry, and management consultancy. He also chairs the Lao-Thai Business Corporation. He is an active Board member of ASTI Holdings.

Writing
Although an economist by training, Chareonwongsak also writes on education policy, business, politics/governance, policy formation, organization restructuring, theories of change, environment, future studies, and social enterprise. He has published more than 200 books and numerous articles, presented over 500 academic papers, 5000 newspaper & magazine articles.

He is a radio and TV commentator, and a newspaper and magazine columnist, on current political and economic issues. His perspectives are often highlighted in interviews both in Thailand and overseas.

His books published in English include Insights into Thailand’s Post-Crisis Economy, Reflections on The Economy: An Economist’s View of Thailand’s Recent Past, Critiquing Thaksin’s Policies, and Moving Thailand Forward.

Academic career
Chareonwongsak is an Eminent Member of the Education Council on Standard and Quality Assurance of the Office of the National Education Commission, and has also filled fifty other positions in a number of national organizations and committees.

He spent years as a senior fellow at the John F. Kennedy School of Government at Harvard University in the US, and was elected member of the Harvard Kennedy School Alumni [Association Board of Directors. He was also an associate at the Weatherhead Centre for International Affairs, at Harvard, and is a member of the university's Thai Studies Committee.

He is an advisor at the Doctoral Programme in International Human Resource Management at Burapha University, Thailand, and is a University Council member of the Doctoral Programme in Business Administration at Suan Sunandha Rajabhat University, Thailand. He is also on the board of trustees at the Asian Institute of Technology and is a member of the Thailand National Research Council Board. At Oxford University, UK, he was a visiting fellow at the Oxford Internet Institute, and was a Fellow of the Skoll Centre for Social Entrepreneurship at the university's Said Business School.

He is also a research professor at Regent University, US, and a member of the Business Administration Advisory Board of the University of the People.

He is professor of management and economics at the OYA Graduate School of Business, Universiti Utara Malaysia.

Political career

He was a member of the National Economic and Social Advisory Council (NESAC), as Chair of the Education, Religion, Arts and Culture Commission and Vice Chair of the Economic, Commerce and Industry Commission.

In 2004, he was elected as a Member of Parliament for the Democrat Party and served until the Dissolution of Parliament in 2006.

In 2005, he ran as a party list Member of Parliament in the elections for the Democrat Party. He was subsequently elected to the executive board of the party and was appointed Deputy Head of the Democrat Economics Team. However, in 2007, he resigned from the Democrat Party due disagreement with the party leader due to disagreement over some party policies and practices.

In 2008, he ran as an independent candidate in the 2008 Bangkok gubernatorial election and finished in fourth place.

Chareonwongsak is an Advisory Committee Member to an International Advisory Panel for the Non-Aligned Movement (NAM) Business Council, and he is a Member of the Committee for Anti-Corruption Cooperation, at the Ministry of Finance. He is Chair and President of the Political Leaders for Social Enterprise, USA, as well as Chair of the Social Entrepreneurship Institute, Thailand.

He has represented Thailand at the following forums and conferences:
 The Third Annual Asian Liberty Forum (2006, Malaysia).
 The Regional Seminar for Parliaments from South-East Asia and the Asia-Pacific Region (2006, Thailand).
 The Bertelsmann Stiftung Global Policy Council (2006, Germany).
 The Smart Partnership International Dialogue (2003, Swaziland), among others.
 The Non-Aligned Movement's Business Forum (Malaysia).
 Association for Public Policy Analysis & Management Research Conference (USA).
 International Business and Economics Research Conference (USA).
 World Future Society Annual Conference (USA).
 The Sixth International Research Symposium on Public Management (IRSPM VI) (Scotland).
 The 31st ARTDO International Management & HRD Conference (Malaysia).
 Creating an ASEAN Community - Key Issues in Building Community.
 2nd ASEAN Leadership Forum, Asian Strategy and Leadership Institute, Kuala Lumpur, Malaysia, March 2005.
 Index of Corporate Social Responsibility: A Study looking at Measuring the level of Thailand's Corporate Social Responsibility, the 3rd International Society of Business, Economics, and Ethics (ISBEE)World Congress
 The International Society of Business, Economics, and Ethics, Australia, July 2004.
 Strengthening Strategic Partnerships-Deepening Relationship with Key Partners-US, China, India and Japan.
 The ASEAN Leadership Forum “Leadership Challenges in 21st Century Southeast Asia: Regional Integration, Competitiveness & Community Building”,Asian Strategy & Leadership Institute
 ASEAN Business Forum (ABF)in association with the Institute of Southeast Asian Studies in Singapore, Kuala Lumpur, Malaysia, March 2004
 Cultural Prerequisites for Development, Bertelsmann Foundation 25th Anniversary Symposium: Transforming Our World Building Democracy,Bertelsmann Foundation, Germany, March 2002.
 Human Security in Development and Crisis: How to Capture It in Regional Institutional Arrangements? And How Can the Asia Leaders' Forum Promote it?,the 1999 Asia Leaders' Forum on Asia Leaders Forum-Human Security in Development and Crisis, Sydney, Australia, April 1999.
 Impact Assessment of Thailand's Promotion of Strategic Export Industries : A Computable General Equilibrium Model (CGE) Approach, EcoMod 2004 International Conference on Policy Modeling, EcoMod co-organized with the CEPII, Paris, France, July, 2004.

References

External links
 
 Dr. Dan Can Do
 Institute of Future Studies for Development Education
 Google Scholar
 profile at Harvard University
 profile at University of Oxford
 Profile at University of the People
Partial bibliography at Success Media
 newshour/bb/business/jan-june07/globalization-06-01.html Interview on PBS about free trade issues, with a Harvard colleague

  Extended CV

Articles in English available online
 aseanaffairs.com Will Vietnam’s growth affect Thailand’s economy?
 Bangkok Post. Broadcast live draft. January 28, 2007

Academic papers in English available online
 The Future Society of Asia 
 Globalization and Technology: How will they change society? Technology in Society 24 (3), 191-206.
 Happiness and Economic Development Targets in Thailand.
 Impact Assessment of Thailand’s Promotion of Strategic Export Industries: A Computable General Equilibrium Model (CGE) Approach by Kriengsak Chareonwongsak and Akrathood Paul Chareonwongsak
 Regional Seminar on Security Sector Reform in the National and Regional Contexts. General introduction: The new thinking and the need for a comprehensive security approach.
 Reshaping Universities for the Future (2000). Foresight, 2 (1), 113-123.

1955 births
Living people
Harvard Kennedy School alumni
Regent University faculty
Kriengsak Chareonwongsak
Kriengsak Chareonwongsak
Kriengsak Chareonwongsak
University of the People faculty